Khortha is a village in Gorakhpur district in Uttar Pradesh, India It is 16 km from Gorakhpur city. Its predominantly a Guptaa & Nishad village, though there are some   Harijan,  Guptaa,.The people of Guptaa and nishad caste are very rich.: It comes under Sahjanwaa election block. The village has its own Government Primary School.

References

Villages in Gorakhpur district